2013 Gastein Ladies is the 2013 edition of the outdoor clay courts women's tennis tournament Gastein Ladies. It was the seventh edition of the tournament, which was part of the 2013 WTA Tour. It took place in Bad Gastein, Austria between 13 and 21 July 2013. Yvonne Meusburger won the singles title.

Singles main draw entrants

Seeds 

 1 Rankings are as of July 8, 2013

Other entrants 
The following players received wildcards into the singles main draw:
  Patricia Mayr-Achleitner
  Lisa-Maria Moser
  Carina Witthöft

The following players received entry from the qualifying draw:
  Elena Bogdan
  Viktorija Golubic
  Michaela Hončová
  Jasmina Tinjić

The following player received entry as lucky loser:
  Dia Evtimova

Withdrawals
Before the tournament
  Jana Čepelová
  Alizé Cornet
  Melinda Czink
  Lucie Hradecká
  Mirjana Lučić-Baroni (gastrointestinal illness)
  Tatjana Maria
  Kristina Mladenovic (fatigue)
  Romina Oprandi (back injury)

Retirements
  Mona Barthel (shoulder injury)

Doubles main draw entrants

Seeds 

 1 Rankings are as of July 8, 2013

Other entrants 
The following pairs received wildcards into the doubles main draw:
  Mona Barthel /  Annika Beck
  Lisa-Maria Moser /  Yvonne Neuwirth

Retirements
  Eva Hrdinová (gastrointestinal illness)

Finals

Singles 

  Yvonne Meusburger defeated  Andrea Hlaváčková, 7-5, 6-2

Doubles 

  Sandra Klemenschits /  Andreja Klepač defeated  Kristina Barrois /  Eleni Daniilidou, 6–1, 6–4

References

External links 
 Official website

Gastein Ladies
Gastein Ladies
2013 in Austrian women's sport
July 2013 sports events in Europe
Gast
Gast